Haile Woldense or Woldetensae (ሃይለ ወልደትንሳኤ) is an Eritrean politician.

Woldense was born in 1946 and attended High School in Asmara, Eritrea. After graduation, he was accepted to the Addis Ababa University engineering program. There he met Isaias Afewerki and they withdrew from school to join the Eritrean Liberation Front.

In 1974 he became a member of what would become the Eritrea People's Liberation Front (EPLF) Central Committee and joined the Political Bureau. He was the head master of EPLF's cadre school, who transformed the movement.

After Independence he became the Minister of Finance and Development and served in that position until 1997. In mid-February 1997, he was instead appointed as Minister of Foreign Affairs. As a member of the G-15, who requested the resignation of the President of Eritrea to end the war with Ethiopia, he was arrested and replaced in his position. 

Amnesty International considers Woldense and the other imprisoned G-15 members to be prisoners of conscience and has called for their immediate release.

References

External links
 Picture of Woldense to the right of picture

1946 births
Addis Ababa University alumni
Amnesty International prisoners of conscience held by Eritrea
Eritrean prisoners and detainees
Foreign ministers of Eritrea
Finance ministers of Eritrea
Government ministers of Eritrea
Living people
People's Front for Democracy and Justice politicians
People from Asmara